Jowshan (also Romanized as Jowshān; also known as Jūishān and Juyi Shān) is a village in Jowshan Rural District, Golbaf District, Kerman County, Kerman Province, Iran. At the 2006 census, its population was 1,420, in 326 families.

References 

Populated places in Kerman County